Phlomidoschema is a genus of flowering plant in the family Lamiaceae, first described as a genus in 1941. It contains only one known species, Phlomidoschema parviflorum, native to south-central Asia  and the northern part of the Indian Subcontinent (Tajikistan, Afghanistan, Iran, Pakistan, western Himalayas, Punjab region in India).

References

Lamiaceae
Flora of Asia
Monotypic Lamiaceae genera